Nino Bertasio (born 30 July 1988) is an Italian professional golfer who plays on the European Tour and is currently attached to the Gardagolf Country Club.

Professional career 
After turning professional in 2011, he joined the Alps Tour. His first win on that tour came in 2014 at the Open St. Francois Region Guadeloupe, followed a week later by another win at the Asiago Open; he went on to win the Order of Merit and qualify for the Challenge Tour.

In 2015 he comfortably retained his card on the Challenge tour, with his best performance at the Volopa Irish Challenge where he lost in a playoff to Tom Murray. At the end of the year he qualified for the 2016 season on the European Tour via qualifying school.

In 2016 Bertasio qualified for the 2016 Summer Olympics and finished tied for 30th.

Bertasio ended 2017 with a strong run of form that included a run of six top-20 finishes in eight tournaments with a share of tenth place at The Italian Open and eighth at the Andalucía Valderrama Masters.

He further established himself on the European Tour in 2018 with another consistent year that included a share of fifth at the Maybank Championship.

In July 2019, Bertasio shot rounds of 63, 67, 67 and 68 at The Renaissance Club to finish in a share of fourth at the Aberdeen Standard Investments Scottish Open, securing a place at The Open Championship at Royal Portrush – his first major – the following week. He made the halfway cut in Northern Ireland, finishing in a share of 72nd.

Amateur wins
2008 Campionato Internazionale d'Italia, Italian Match Play, Italian National Stroke Play
2010 Copa Sotogrande, European Team (Individual)

Source:

Professional wins (4)

Alps Tour wins (2)

EPD Tour wins (1)

Other wins (1)
2011 Italian Omnium Open

Playoff record
Challenge Tour playoff record (0–1)

Results in major championships

"T" = tied for place

Team appearances
European Amateur Team Championship (representing Italy): 2008, 2009, 2010
Eisenhower Trophy (representing Italy): 2008, 2010
St Andrews Trophy (representing the Continent of Europe): 2010 (winners)

See also
2015 European Tour Qualifying School graduates

References

External links
Official website

Italian male golfers
European Tour golfers
Olympic golfers of Italy
Golfers at the 2016 Summer Olympics
1988 births
Living people